Doraiswamy Raju or D. Raju (born 2 July 1939) was an Indian Judge and former Justice of The Supreme Court of India.

Career
Raju was graduated in 1959 and obtained B.L. degree in Law in 1961 from the Madras University. In 1962 he was enrolled as an advocate in Madras Bar Association and started practice in various High Courts of India on Civil, Constitutional, Taxation and Land related matters. Raju worked as Standing Counsel for various Public Institutions and Undertakings of Tamil Nadu and Andhra Pradesh Government including Food Corporation of India. He was designated as Senior Advocate of Madras High Court in 1987. He was appointed the Judge of the same High Court in 1990. On 17 November 1995 Justice Raju became the Chairman, Advisory Board of COFEPOSA. He was elevated in the post of Chief Justice, Himachal Pradesh High Court on 1 July 1998 and in 2000 he was appointed Justice of the Supreme Court of India. Raju retired from judgeship on 1 July 2004.

References

1939 births
Living people
University of Madras alumni
Justices of the Supreme Court of India
Chief Justices of the Himachal Pradesh High Court
Judges of the Madras High Court
20th-century Indian judges
21st-century Indian judges